Johann Cramer (July 29, 1905 – January 14, 1987) was a German politician of the Social Democratic Party (SPD) and former member of the German Bundestag.

Life 
He became a member of the German Bundestag in 1949 as a directly elected member of parliament in the Wilhelmshaven - Friesland constituency and was chairman of the Bundestag committee for postal and telecommunications services during this legislative period. He was again a member of the Bundestag from 1957 to 1972. He was able to win his constituency directly in 1961 and 1969; in the other legislative periods he entered parliament via his party's Lower Saxony state list.

Literature

References

1905 births
1987 deaths
Members of the Bundestag for Lower Saxony
Members of the Bundestag 1969–1972
Members of the Bundestag 1965–1969
Members of the Bundestag 1961–1965
Members of the Bundestag 1957–1961
Members of the Bundestag 1949–1953
Members of the Bundestag for the Social Democratic Party of Germany